The Acatinga virus (ACTV) is a serotype of Changuinola virus. ACTV was first isolated from phlebotomine sandflies in the Amazon region of Brazil. This virus have not reported to cause disease in humans.

References

Orbiviruses